Koos Kombuis (born André le Roux du Toit, 5 November 1954) is a South African musician, singer, songwriter and writer who became famous as part of a group of anti-establishment maverick Afrikaans musicians, who, under the collective name of Voëlvry (directly translated meaning "Free as a bird"; in Afrikaans "voëlvry" is synonymous to the words "fugitive" and "outlaw"), toured campuses across South Africa in the 1980s, to "liberate Afrikaans from the shackles of its past".  Fellow musicians of this movement were Johannes Kerkorrel and Bernoldus Niemand (James Phillips).

They were a younger generation Afrikaner who didn't believe in apartheid and didn't toe the ruling National Party line. This movement coined the term "Alternative Afrikaner" for themselves. Kombuis is something of an icon among certain South Africans who consider him the guru of Afrikaans rock music and father of non-conformist Afrikaans culture.

Humorous stage name 

Koos Kombuis is his humorous stage name as well as his pen name.  Koos (sounding like "koo-iss") is a shortened version for the common name "Jacobus" / "Jakobus", but is also Afrikaans slang for a chamber pot.  Kombuis means "Kitchen" in Afrikaans.  His childhood nickname was "Koos", and he got his last name from a time when he squatted in the kitchen of former drug-dealer and author Al Lovejoy.

Du Toit started out as a poet and novelist in the early 1980s writing under the name André dutoit,but wanting something more colloquial-sounding for his musical career, settled on Koos Kombuis.

He has introduced an A in his stage name, now being Koos A. Kombuis. The A is for Andre, formed part of his first stage name, Andre le Toit. He claims the fact that the spelling of his initials, K.A.K ("shit" in Afrikaans), is purely coincidental.

Early life 

Du Toit grew up in Riversdale, Paarl, Wellington, Kuruman and in Bellville, before the family settled in Stellenbosch (and later in Pretoria), where he spent the last year of high school at Paul Roos Gymnasium.  After school, Du Toit did his compulsory military service: apparently he was so bad at shooting that he was posted in the fire brigade. After this, Du Toit went back to the fire brigade several times, the only job he claims he was never fired from (Kombuis 2000: 78).

After the army, he wanted to study at the Stellenbosch University with his childhood friends. However, he explained that "I tried to enrol at Stellenbosch. They didn't accept me. I had a bit of a reputation already. Punk skrywer en al hierdie k*k. I decided to stay on the campus for three years anyway because the most important thing about varsity is human knowledge. I only went to two classes. My parents thought I was doing stories for Huisgenoot". But his parents insisted he attend the University of Pretoria instead.  He left after two years, never finishing a degree, and moved to Johannesburg where he settled in an apartment in Hillbrow.  Here he was involved in a lot of different fringe churches and religious denominations, but got increasingly worried about his own mental health.

He finally went back to his parents in Pretoria and asked to get medical help. After seeing several psychologists and being severely medicated, the decision was taken to give him shock therapy. Du Toit claims that after ten treatments, he suffered amnesia and effectively can't remember the year 1976 to date. After this treatment his parents had him committed to Weskoppies psychiatric hospital in Pretoria (wrongly) diagnosed as having schizophrenia. This was decided after a questionnaire and a single rorschach test .  After psychiatrists realised that he wasn't sick, he'd spent a year in a psychiatric ward.

At this point he started sending his short stories to Afrikaans weekly Huisgenoot, and spent the next few years as a freelance writer, publishing several novellas, volumes of poetry and short stories.  His first (semi-autobiographical) novel Somer II ("Summer II") appeared in 1985.  His next autobiography, Seks & Drugs & Boeremusiek: die memoires van 'n volksverraaier ("Sex, drugs and Boere (folk) musiek: the memoires of a national traitor") appeared in 2000.  In this book he corrected many of the more far-fetched claims he made in Somer II.

Musical style 

He cites Bob Dylan, Neil Young as well as ex-Beatles George Harrison and John Lennon as musical influences.  His musical style is raw, and Kombuis often accompanies himself only with his acoustic guitar, but sometimes uses his backing rock band known as "Die Warmblankes" ("The Almost Drunk / Mellow Whites"), a play on the Afrikaans word 'armblankes' (poor whites). One of his most popular hits is "Lisa se Klavier" ("Lisa's Piano"), which has been covered by Laurika Rauch and The Parlotones.

Discography 

 Ver van die Ou Kalahari (1987) (as André Letoit) 
 Niemandsland and Beyond (1990)
 Elke Boemelaar se Droom (1994)
 Madiba Bay (1997)
 Blameer dit op Apartheid (1997)
 Mona Lisa (1999)
 Greatest Hits (2000)
 Blou Kombuis (2000, live with Albert Frost)
 Equilibrium (2002)
 'n Jaar in die Son (2003)
 Bloedrivier (2008)
 Koos Kombuis (2009, self-titled)
 dertien (2012)
 Lente in die Boland (2013)
 Langpad na Lekkersing (2017)
 Nag Van Die Honde (2023)

Writings 

Novels:

 Somer II (1985 – as André Letoit)
 Suidpunt-Jazz (1989 – as André Letoit)
 Paradise Redecorated (1990)
 Hotel Atlantis (2003)
 The Secret Diary of God (2003)
 Raka die Roman (2005)
 The Complete Secret Diaries of God (2008)
 i-Tjieng, 'n GPS vir Verdwaalde Siele (2013)
 Blasjan en die Blou Kitaar (2018)

Short Stories & Collections:

 Nou is die Kaap weer Hollands (1982 – as André Letoit)
 My nooi is in 'n tikmasjien (1983 – as André Letoit)
 Breekwater en ander kortverhale (1986 – as André Letoit)
 My Mamma is 'n Taal (2001)
 Afrikaans my darling (2003)
 Die dieper dors: 'n innerlike gesprek (2006)
 Die Reuk van Koffie (2011)

Poetry & Lyrics:

 Suburbia (1982 – as André Letoit)
 Die Geel Kafee (1985 – as André Letoit)
 Die Bar op De Aar (1988 – as André Letoit)
 Koos se Songs (1998)
 Die tweede Reën (1998)

Memoirs:

See also

References

External links 
 Official Koos Kombuis website
 Koos Kombuis weblog
 Koos Kombuis on Litnet (in Afrikaans)
 Koos Kombuis column on Kagablog
 Afrikaans article about Koos Kombuis

1954 births
Afrikaner anti-apartheid activists
Afrikaner people
Afrikaans-language poets
Afrikaans-language singers
Living people
White South African anti-apartheid activists
University of Pretoria alumni
Musicians from Cape Town
Alumni of Paul Roos Gymnasium